This is list of political parties in Nigeria.

The Federal Republic of Nigeria has a multi-party system. The largest by National Assembly seats are the All Progressives Congress (APC) and the People's Democratic Party (PDP). There are also a number of smaller parties, the largest of which are All Progressives Grand Alliance (APGA) and Young Progressives Party (YPP) as well as others including the African Democratic Congress (ADC), People's Redemption Party (PRP), Social Democratic Party (SDP), and eleven other parties registered with the Independent National Electoral Commission.

Current parties

Parties represented in the National Assembly

Other parties represented in state assemblies

Extraparliamentary parties

Unregistered parties 
These active (or recently active) parties are not currently registered with the Independent National Electoral Commission. After the 2019 elections, INEC deregistered 74 political parties for failing to "satisfy the requirements" of continued registration based on their poor performances during the elections. However, many of these parties are still organizationally active as the deregistration of 23 of the parties is being challenged in court as of 2022 while the complete deregistration Supreme Court case was only settled in May 2021. There are also prospective parties, like the revival of the Movement of the People, where there is yet to be a decision on their registration.

 Abundant Nigeria Renewal Party (ANRP)
 Advanced Allied Party (AAP)
 Advanced Congress of Democrats (ACD)
 Advanced Nigeria Democratic Party (ANDP)
 Advanced Peoples Democratic Alliance (APDA)
 African People Alliance (APA)
 All Blended Party (ABP)
 All Grand Alliance Party (AGAP)
 All Grassroots Alliance (AGA)
 Alliance National Party (ANP)
 Alliance Of Social Democrats (ASD)
 Alliance for Democracy (AD)
 Alliance for New Nigeria (ANN)
 Alliance for a United Nigeria (AUN)
 Allied Congress Party Of Nigeria (ACPN)
 Alternative Party of Nigeria (APN)
 Better Nigeria Progressive Party (BNPP)
 Change Advocacy Party (CAP)
 Change Nigeria Party (CNP)
 Coalition For Change (C4C)
 Communist Party of Nigeria (CPN)
 Congress of Patriots (COP)
 Democratic Alternative (DA)
 Democratic People's Party (DPP)
 Democratic People’s Congress (DPC)
 Democratic Socialist Movement (DSM)
 Freedom And Justice Party (FJP)
 Fresh Democratic Party (FDP)
 Grassroots Development Party Of Nigeria (GDPN)
 Green Party of Nigeria (GPN)
 Hope Democratic Party (HDP)
 Independent Democrats (ID)
 Justice Must Prevail Party (JMPP)
 KOWA Party (KP)
 Legacy Party of Nigeria (LPN)
 Liberation Movement (LM)
 Mass Action Joint Alliance (MAJA)
 Masses Movement of Nigeria (MMN)
 Mega Party Of Nigeria (MPN)
 Modern Democratic Party (MDP)
 Movement for the Restoration and Defence of Democracy (MRDD)
 Movement of the People (MOP)
 National Action Council (NAC)
 National Conscience Party (NCP)
 National Democratic Liberty Party (NDLP)
 National Interest Party (NIP)
 National Unity Party (NUP)
 New Generations Party of Nigeria (NGP)
 New Progressive Movement (NPM)
 Nigeria Community Movement Party (NCMP)
 Nigeria Democratic Congress Party (NDCP)
 Nigeria Elements Progressive Party (NEPP)
 Nigeria For Democracy (NFD)
 Nigeria People’s Congress (NPC)
 People for Democratic Change (PDC)
 People's Progressive Party (PPP)
 People’s Democratic Movement (PDM)
 People’s Party of Nigeria (PPN)
 People’s Trust (PT)
 Progressive Peoples Alliance (PPA)
 Providence People's Congress (PPC)
 Re-Build Nigeria Party (RBNP)
 Reform and Advancement Party (RAP)
 Restoration Party of Nigeria (RP)
 Save Nigeria Congress (SNC)
 Social Democratic Mega Party (SDMP)
 Socialist Party of Nigeria (SPN)
 Sustainable National Party (SNP)
 United Democratic Party (UDP)
 United Nigeria People's Party (UNPP)
 United Patriots (UP)
 United People's Congress (UPC)
 United Progressive Party (UPP)
 Unity Party of Nigeria (UPN)
 We The People Nigeria (WTPN)
 Yes Electorates Solidarity (YES)
 Young Democratic Party (YDP)
 Youth Party (YP)

Historical parties

First Republic

 Action Group (AG)
 Borno Youth Movement (BYM)
 Convention People's Party of Nigeria and the Cameroons
 Democratic Party of Nigeria and Cameroon (DPNC)
 Dynamic Party (DP)
 Igala Union (IU)
 Igbira Tribal Union (ITU)
 Kano People's Party (KPP)
 Lagos State United Front (LSUF)
 Mabolaje Grand Alliance (MGA)
 Midwest Democratic Front (MDF)
 National Independence Party (NIP)
 National Council of Nigeria and the Cameroons/National Council of Nigerian Citizens (NCNC)
 Niger Delta Congress (NDC)
 Nigerian National Democratic Party (NNDP)
 Northern Elements Progressive Union (NEPU)
 Northern People's Congress (NPC)
 Northern Progressive Front (NPF)
 Republican Party (RP)
 United Middle Belt Congress (UMBC)
 United National Independence Party (UNIP)
 Zamfara Commoners Party (ZCP)

Second Republic
 Greater Nigerian People's Party (GNPP)
 Movement of the People Party (MPP)
 National Party of Nigeria (NPN)
 Nigeria Advance Party (NAP)
 Nigerian People's Party (NPP)
 People's Redemption Party (PRP)
 Unity Party of Nigeria (UPN)

Third Republic
 National Republican Convention (NRC)
 Social Democratic Party (SDP)

Abacha era
 Committee for National Consensus (CNC)
 Democratic Party of Nigeria (DPN)
 Grassroots Democratic Movement (GDM)
 Justice Party (JP)
 National Centre Party of Nigeria (NCPN)
 National Democratic Coalition (NADECO)
 United Nigeria Congress Party (UNCP)

Fourth Republic

 Aboki Wawa Arewa Movement (AWAM)
 Action Congress of Nigeria (ACN)
 African Renaissance Party (ARP)
 All Democratic Peoples Movement (ADPM)
 All Nigeria Peoples Party (ANPP)
 All People's Party (APP)
 Alliance for Democracy (AD)
 Citizens Popular Party (CPP)
 Congress for Progressive Change (CPC)
 Conscience People's Congress (CPC)
 Grassroot Patriotic Party (GPP)
 National Democratic Party (NDP)
 New Democrats (ND)
 Nigeria Poor People Party (NPPP)
 People's Salvation Party (PSP)

 New Nigeria people party (NNPP)

See also
 Politics of Nigeria
 Lists of political parties; categories by country and ideology''

References

Nigeria
 
Political parties
Political parties
Nigeria